The following highways are numbered 321:

Canada
 Nova Scotia Route 321
 Saskatchewan Highway 321

China
 China National Highway 321

Costa Rica
 National Route 321

Japan
 Japan National Route 321

United States
  U.S. Highway 321
  Arkansas Highway 321
  Arkansas Highway 321 Spur
  Georgia State Route 321 (former)
  Kentucky Route 321
  Louisiana Highway 321
  Mississippi Highway 321
  Nevada State Route 321
  New Mexico State Road 321
 New York:
  New York State Route 321
  County Route 321 (Erie County, New York)
  North Carolina Highway 321 (former)
  Ohio State Route 321
  Pennsylvania Route 321
  Puerto Rico Highway 321
  Tennessee State Route 321
 Texas:
  Texas State Highway 321
  Texas State Highway Loop 321
  Farm to Market Road 321
  Virginia State Route 321
 Virginia State Route 321 (former)
  Wyoming Highway 321